Reminder may refer to:

Music

"Reminder" (song), a song by The Weeknd from his 2016 album Starboy
 Reminder (album), a 2012 album by Pixel
A Reminder, a 2011 EP by Drake Bell
The Reminder, a 2007 album by Feist
"Reminder", a song by Mumford & Sons from their 2012 album Babel

Other uses
ReminderNews, a newspaper in eastern Connecticut
Reminder software, calendar-type programs
Reminders (Apple), an Apple task management program
The Reminder (Flin Flon), a Canadian newspaper
The Reminder (Springfield), a Massachusetts newspaper